Ǯ (minuscule: ǯ) is a modified letter of the Latin alphabet, formed from ezh (ʒ) with the addition of a caron.

In the Uralic Phonetic Alphabet, it represents the sound .

Following its UPA usage, it was adopted in the Skolt Sami alphabet for the same value. It typically appears doubled, where it represents a geminate . e.g. viǯǯâd "to fetch". The letter is also used in Laz, where it represents . Until 2007 it was also used by Olonets Karelian language.

Encoding

Latin letters with diacritics
Phonetic transcription symbols